Hiran Ralalage (born 21 July 1981) is a Sri Lankan cricketer who played for the Malaysia national cricket team. He played in the 2014 ICC World Cricket League Division Five tournament.

References

External links
 

1981 births
Living people
Malaysian cricketers
Cricketers from Colombo
Sri Lankan emigrants to Malaysia
Sri Lankan expatriates in Malaysia